Gymnoxenisthmus tigrellus, is a species of family Xenisthmidae, regarded as a synonym of the Eleotridae. This species is the only known member of its genus.

References

Xenisthmidae
Eleotridae
Monotypic fish genera
Fish described in 2014